Xiázhou or Xiá Prefecture (written as 硤州 before the 10th century, and 峽州 thereafter) was a zhou (prefecture) in imperial China centering on modern Yichang, Hubei, China. It existed (intermittently) from the 6th century to 1376.

Geography
The administrative region of Xiá Prefecture in the Tang dynasty is under the administration of modern Yichang, Hubei. It probably includes parts of modern: 
Yichang
Yidu
Changyang Tujia Autonomous County
Yuan'an County

References
 

Prefectures of the Sui dynasty
Prefectures of the Tang dynasty
Prefectures of the Song dynasty
Prefectures of the Yuan dynasty
Prefectures of the Ming dynasty
Prefectures of Jingnan
Former prefectures in Hubei